Neotys develops a software testing tool designed to improve the quality and performance of information systems, its primary product, NeoLoad, is the most automated performance testing platform for enterprise organizations continuously testing from APIs to applications. Neotys is a privately owned company.

History 
Neotys was founded in 2005 by a group of software developers and IT project managers who recognized a demand for a new software solution to test the performance of web applications before launch. Since then, Neotys has delivered software solutions to more than 2000 clients in 70 countries, with exports accounting for more than 75% of the company's annual turnover.

References

Software companies of France
Companies established in 2005